Burlington Transit is the public transport provider in the city of Burlington, Ontario, Canada. Services began in September 1975, after the city had been served by neighbouring systems including Hamilton Street Railway (HSR) and former subsidiary Canada Coach Lines, as well as "local" services to and from Toronto once provided by Gray Coach Lines and GO Transit along Lakeshore Road (Highway 2).

Burlington Transit is a member of the Canadian Urban Transit Association.

It connects with Hamilton Street Railway to the south and west and Oakville Transit to the east. In addition, the Appleby, Burlington, and Aldershot GO Transit stations on the Lakeshore West line are also connected. The bus terminal, located in downtown at 430 John Street, close to Lakeshore Road (Highway 2), is the main bus terminal. The transit yard and administration centre is situated at 3332 Harvester Road.

Bus services

Regular routes
 All regular routes are serviced by accessible buses.

Connecting transit

Oakville Transit routes:
 14 Lakeshore West – runs along the eastern perimeter of Burlington on Burloak Drive into the Appleby GO.
 5 Dundas – runs along Dundas Street into the GO 407 Carpool.

Hamilton Street Railway routes:
 11 Parkdale – runs from Burlington Bus Terminal, via Beach Boulevard, Parkdale Avenue and the Red Hill Valley Parkway to Valley Park Loop in the Stoney Creek area of southeastern Hamilton.
 18 Waterdown – runs north from Aldershot GO Station to provide service to Waterdown.

GO Transit routes:
 Burlington Transit connects with GO Transit at Appleby, Burlington, Aldershot stations and at the Highway 407 carpool lot.

Via Rail and Amtrak routes:
 Burlington Transit and Hamilton Street Railway buses connect with Via Rail (Canada's national passenger inter-city train services) and Amtrak trains to the United States at Aldershot station.

Paratransit
Burlington Transit operates door-to-door service for people with physical disabilities, which is called "Handi-Van".

Fares
Sale of paper tickets to the general public ended on August 31, 2019, and were no longer accepted as payment after December 31, 2019. Fares shown here are effective January 1, 2020.

Seniors 65+ ride free between 9:00 am and 2:30 pm. Children aged 12 and under ride fare free year-round. Note that monthly bus passes have been suspended until further notice.

Riders paying by cash (or, in some cases, special purpose paper tickets) can request a paper transfer from the bus driver; for riders using Presto cards, the transfer is automatically recorded on the card. Both are valid for two hours from the time of boarding the first bus and can be used to transfer between Burlington Transit (BT) buses in any direction – as well as to transfer to neighbouring Oakville Transit and Hamilton Street Railway buses – without having to pay another fare. 

Riders transferring from GO Transit to BT buses receive free admission when they show their valid GO ticket or transit pass to the driver (at connecting GO stations only) or when swiping the Presto card. Passengers transferring from BT to GO Transit services will be reimbursed the difference between the BT fare and the co-fare discount upon disembarking GO Transit.

Stations, terminals and garages
 Burlington GO Station
 Appleby GO Station
 Aldershot GO Station
 Wal-Mart Plaza at First Pro Centre
 Dundas St. @ Highway 407 Park & Ride (Burlington Carpool Lot)
 Main garage: Burlington Transit Facility on Harvester Road

Burlington Bus Terminal

The bus terminal is located in downtown Burlington on John Street, just north of Pine Street. The terminal is an on-street facility with northbound and southbound curbside bus bays and a customer service building on the west side of the street. The terminal is an important central transfer location for Burlington Transit and a terminus for Hamilton Street Railway services.

See also

 Public transport in Canada

References

External links

 Burlington Transit website (includes route maps)
 Drawings and photos of Burlington Transit buses by Peter McLaughlin

1975 establishments in Ontario
Companies based in Burlington, Ontario
Transport in Burlington, Ontario
Transit agencies in Ontario